The Standard Carrier Alpha Code (SCAC) is a privately controlled US code used to identify vessel operating common carriers (VOCC). It is typically two to four letters long. The National Motor Freight Traffic Association developed the SCAC code in the 1960s to help road transport companies computerize data and records.

Description 
The Standard Carrier Alpha Code, a two-to-four letter identification, is used by the transportation industry to identify freight carriers in computer systems and shipping documents such as Bill of Lading, Freight Bill, Packing List, and Purchase Order.  It is also used by the American National Standards Institute, Accredited Standards Committee X12, and United Nations EDIFACT for Electronic Data Interchange computer systems.

SCACs are commonly used by the automobile, petroleum, forest products, and chemical industries; as well as suppliers to retail businesses, carriers engaged in railroad piggyback trailers, and ocean container drayage. SCACs can be obtained online at http://www.nmfta.org.

Freight Carriers who participate in the Uniform Intermodal Interchange Agreement (UIIA) are required to maintain a SCAC.   
Certain groups of SCACs are reserved for specific purposes. Codes ending with the letter "U" are reserved for the identification of freight containers. Codes ending with the letter "X" are reserved for the identification of privately owned railroad cars. Codes ending with the letter "Z" are reserved for the identification of truck chassis and trailers used in intermodal service.

SCAC is also used to identify an ocean carrier or self-filing party, such as a freight forwarder, for the Automated Manifest System used by US Customs and Border Protection for electronic import customs clearance and for manifest transmission as per the USA's "24 Hours Rule" which requires the carrier to transmit a cargo manifest to US Customs at least 24 hours prior to a vessel's departure at port of loading.

Widely used SCACs
The following is a list of widely used SCACs:

See also
 Bill of Lading
 EDIFACT
 Electronic Data Interchange
 ISO 6346, an international standard for marking intermodal containers
 Less than truckload
 National Motor Freight Traffic Association
 Reporting mark

References

Road haulage
Encodings